Bong-5 is an electoral district for the elections to the House of Representatives of Liberia. The constituency covers Suakoko District and five communities of Yeallequelleh District (i.e. Gbartala, Palala, Fenutoli, Garyea and Tomgbeyah).

Elected representatives

References

Electoral districts in Liberia